Tabu is a 2012 Portuguese independent black-and-white drama film directed by Miguel Gomes, the title of which references F. W. Murnau's silent film of the same name. The film competed at the 62nd Berlin International Film Festival, where it won the Alfred Bauer Award (Silver Bear for a feature film that opens new perspectives) and The International Federation of Film Critics (FIPRESCI) prizes.

Plot
Prologue
A narrator, Miguel Gomes himself, reads in voice-over a poetic and philosophical text that invokes a legend in which the Creator orders, but the heart commands: the suicide of an intrepid explorer who, somewhere in Africa, long ago, plunges into a turbid river after a frustrated love affair and is devoured by a crocodile. Many swear they have seen a beautiful woman and a sad crocodile on the riverbank and that the two share a mysterious empathy.

Part 1—Paradise Lost
Three disparate women dwell in an old building in Lisbon. Aurora, an octogenarian living off her pension, eccentric, talkative and superstitious, seeming more dead than alive, and Santa, her housemaid from Cape Verde, live at the same apartment. Santa is semi-literate, but proficient in the divinatory art of voodoo. Pilar, their neighbor and friend, a Catholic middle-aged woman, and militant social benefactor, involves herself in their psychodramas.

Pilar has another friend, a romantic painter in love, a gentleman who insists on offering her tacky pieces of art. But Pilar is more concerned with Aurora: with Aurora's solitude, with her frequent escapes to the casino. She is even more worried about Santa, with her long silences and devil arts. Santa thinks it better to take care of oneself without annoying others, so keeps quiet.

Something else concerns the old lady: understanding she will die soon, she feels someone is missing her, someone her friends have never heard about: Gian-Luca Ventura. So she asks Pilar to find him. She succeeds in doing so and the man appears. He is an old colonist, a disturbed man, from Mozambique, a former Portuguese colony. Another story emerges, beginning: "Aurora had a farm in Africa at the foothill of Mount Tabu..."

Part 2—Paradise
Flashback: The story of Aurora's life, told by Gian-Luca Ventura in voice over. This part takes place shortly before the Portuguese Colonial War began.

In 1960s Portuguese Africa, Aurora and her husband live together near the Tabu Mountain. She is a skilled hunter, never missing a shot. She owns a small crocodile, a gift from her husband, which moves around the house as a pet.

One day, the animal runs away. The pregnant Aurora finds it in Ventura's house, where they consummate their existing mutual attraction; a passionate and dangerous love affair ensues. Gian-Luca confides in his friend, Mario, about the affair. Mario demands that Gian-Luca end the affair and when he is ignored, the two start fighting. The heavily pregnant Aurora picks up a revolver and shoots and kills Mario. She later gives birth to a girl. Two days later, Gian-Luca leaves Africa for good.

Cast
 Teresa Madruga as Pilar
 Laura Soveral as Old Aurora
 Ana Moreira as Young Aurora
 Henrique Espírito Santo as Old Ventura 
 Carloto Cotta as Young Ventura
 Isabel Muñoz Cardoso as Santa
 Ivo Müller as Aurora's Husband 
 Manuel Mesquita as Mário
 Miguel Gomes as Narrator

Reception 
Tabu is the Portuguese film with the widest international distribution as of 2012 and the fifth from Portugal to be commercially released in New York (Film Forum, December 2012), after The Art of Amalia by Bruno de Almeida (2000, Quad Cinema), O Fantasma by João Pedro Rodrigues (2003, IFC Center) and, in 2011, The Strange Case of Angelica by Manoel de Oliveira (IFC Center) and Mists by Ricardo Costa (Quad Cinema).

Critical reception
Critic Peter Bradshaw of The Guardian awarded Tabu four of five stars, and called the film "a gem: gentle, eccentric, possessed of a distinctive sort of innocence—and also charming and funny." But in his review of Tabu, New York Times critic A. O. Scott faults the director for glossing over the issues of colonialism in the film in favor of simple aestheticism. "Unlike other recent European films (like Philippe Falardeau’s Congorama and Claire Denis’s White Material), Tabu views colonialism as an aesthetic opportunity rather than a political or moral problem," wrote Scott. "It is full of longing—hedged, self-conscious, but palpable all the same—for a vanished way of life, in contrast to which contemporary reality seems drab and numb." This view was not shared by The New Yorker'''s critic Richard Brody, who wrote, "Gomes sees the predatory injustices of colonial life as a sort of Wild West of anarchic self-indulgence and self-reinvention . . . Nothing suggests nostalgia for or ambivalence about Portugal's colonial empire." Brody called Tabu "one of the most original and inventive—as well as trenchantly political and painfully romantic—movies of recent years".

On review aggregator website Rotten Tomatoes, the film has a "certified fresh" approval rating of 88% based on 60 reviews, and an average rating of 7.9/10.  The website’s consensus reads: "Mysterious and visually striking, Tabu'' rewards audiences' patience with a swooning romance shot with experimental flair". On Metacritic, the film has a weighted average score of 78 out of 100, based on 17 critics, indicating "generally favorable reviews". Sight & Sound film magazine listed it at #2 on its list of best films of 2012. In 2016, the film was ranked among the 100 greatest films since 2000 in an international poll of 177 critics.

See also
 List of black-and-white films produced since 1970

References

External links
 
 

2012 drama films
2012 films
Portuguese drama films
Portuguese independent films
2010s Portuguese-language films
Portuguese black-and-white films
Films directed by Miguel Gomes
Golden Globes (Portugal) winners
2012 independent films
Films shot in Portugal
Sophia Award winners